The Nandu River Iron Bridge, also known as the Devil's Iron Bridge, Old Iron Bridge, and originally the Lu Palace Bridge, is a partially collapsed, steel truss bridge over the Nandu River, in the north of Hainan Province, China. Opened to traffic in 1942, it was Hainan's first bridge over the Nandu River.

History
The bridge was built by the Imperial Japanese Army during the Second Sino-Japanese War to provide access to the land west of the river. On March 26, 1940, approval was given to begin design and construction. The responsibility for the bridge's construction was given to the Japanese company Shimizu Group Contracting, with the steel frames built by Taiwan's Kaohsiung Shipbuilding Production and Installation.

A cylindrical, concrete guard house remains at the eastern end with horizontal openings. The bridge was designed for a maximum useful lifespan of 20 years, and could carry 20 tons. After Japan's defeat in World War II, the bridge entered civilian service with a 10-ton load limit and one-way traffic only.

As the Nandu River Iron Bridge deteriorated and became dangerous, it was closed to traffic and preserved as a monument.

Safety concerns
In October 2000, flooding caused the collapse of the western part of the bridge, leaving three trusses. These trusses are corroded, with many of the struts heavily pitted or completely rusted through. Concerns over the potential for collapse of the remains have prompted discussions over whether it should be dismantled. Local residents and others wish to preserve it as a historical monument.

Today, the bridge attracts such visitors as photographers, tourists, couples using the site as a backdrop for wedding photo shoots, and on September 18 each year, people gather to pay tribute.

References

External links

 Historical images

Bridges to nowhere
Bridges completed in 1942
Road bridges in China
Bridges in Hainan
Transport in Hainan
1942 establishments in China